Henry Shapland "Harry" Colt (4 August 1869 – 21 November 1951) was a golf course architect born in Highgate, England. He worked predominantly with Charles Alison, John Morrison, and Alister MacKenzie, in 1928 forming Colt, Alison & Morrison Ltd. He participated in the design or redesign of over 300 golf courses (115 on his own) in all six inhabited continents, including those at Wentworth Club, Sunningdale, Muirfield, Royal Portrush, and Royal Liverpool.

Colt teamed up with George Crump in 1918 to design Pine Valley Golf Club, which is ranked as the #1 golf course in the United States, by Golf magazine (2017–18 ranking of the Top 100 Courses in the U.S.) and Golf Digest (2019–20 ranking of America's 100 Greatest Golf Courses). The classic Plum Hollow Country Club in Southfield, Michigan, was designed by Colt and Alison in 1921. The course played host to the 1947 PGA Championship, the 1957 Western Open, and Ryder Cup Challenge Matches in 1943.

Colt was educated at Monkton Combe School near Bath, before taking a law degree at Clare College, Cambridge, where he captained the Cambridge University Golf Club in 1890.

In 1897 he became a founder member of the Royal & Ancient Rules of Golf Committee.

Career

Colt's courses of note in the UK include: Tandridge Golf Club, which features Colt Corner, Oxford Golf Club, Ladbrook Park Golf Club, Denham Golf Club, St George's Hill, Sunningdale (New course), Belfairs Golf Club, Rye, Blackmoor, Swinley Forest, Brancepeth Castle, Brokenhurst Manor, Camberley Heath, Calcot Park, Goring and Streatley Golf Club, Grimsby Golf Club, Hendon Golf Club, Tyneside and the East & West Courses at Wentworth Club. He performed extensive redesigns of Sunningdale (Old course), Woodhall Spa, and of Muirfield, Royal Liverpool Golf Club, Hoylake, and Royal Portrush, three of the courses on the rota for the Open Championship. In Canada, his courses for the Hamilton Golf and Country Club and the Toronto Golf Club are highly respected. He also designed in 1914 the first Spanish course bigger than 4.300 yards, the Club de Golf Sant Cugat, promoted by the Barcelona Traction Light and Power Company Ltd.

Results in major championships
Note: Colt played in only The Open Championship and The Amateur Championship.

DNP = Did not play
"T" indicates a tie for a place
R128, R64, R32, R16, QF, SF = Round in which player lost in match play
Yellow background for top-10

Team appearances
England–Scotland Amateur Match (representing England): 1908

References

External links
Colt Association Official Site
Oxford Dictionary of National Biography article by Mark Pottle, 'Colt, Henry Shapland [Harry] (1869–1951)'  accessed 2 March 2007
Bath Golf Club Official Site

Golf course architects
Alumni of Clare College, Cambridge
People educated at Monkton Combe School
People from Highgate
1869 births
1951 deaths